Escadron de Transport 41 Verdun is a French Air and Space Force squadron located at Vélizy – Villacoublay Air Base, Yvelines, France which operates the SOCATA TBM 700.

See also

 List of French Air and Space Force aircraft squadrons

References

French Air and Space Force squadrons